Poleon is an Anglo-Norman originating name popular in England and Ireland.

Etymology and history of the surname 
Poleon came to England with the ancestors of the Poleon family in the Norman Conquest of 1066AD. It comes from the Norman-Christian given name Paulinus, which belonged to an early Anglo-Norman settler. First found in Staffordshire from very ancient times, and Lincolnshire where they were Lords of the Manor of Odcombe. The origin of the name has long since faded over time but most scholars give the name as a Norman Christian name belonging to a settler, Paulinus, who landed in England soon after the Norman Conquest. It is often believed that the name originated from France because of its close relation to the name Napoleon but this is not the case.

The name Poleon is seen globally. It is most popular in Europe but is also seen in Australia, America, Canada, China and India.

Famous persons with the Poleon surname 
Dominic Poleon (British Footballer.)

References 

Surnames of Norman origin